There are several mathematical theorems named after Ferdinand Georg Frobenius. They include:

 Frobenius theorem (differential topology) in differential geometry and topology for integrable subbundles
 Frobenius theorem (real division algebras) in abstract algebra characterizing the finite-dimensional real division algebras
 Frobenius reciprocity theorem in group representation theory describing the reciprocity relation between restricted and induced representations on a subgroup
 Perron–Frobenius theorem in matrix theory concerning the eigenvalues and eigenvectors of a matrix with positive real coefficients
Frobenius's theorem (group theory) about the number of solutions of xn=1 in a group

 
Mathematics disambiguation pages